Bland House is a two-story frame Colonial Revival-style house located in Alexandria, Louisiana.  It was added to the National Register of Historic Places in 1985.

It has a colossal Tuscan pedimented portico.  The tympanum has a vent with a Palladian window design.  The four columns' capitals are ornamented with molded leaf forms.

References

Houses on the National Register of Historic Places in Louisiana
Colonial Revival architecture in Louisiana
Houses completed in 1910
Houses in Alexandria, Louisiana
National Register of Historic Places in Rapides Parish, Louisiana